Prague International Film Festival - Febiofest is one of the largest film festivals in the Czech Republic and the second most prestigious festival in the country (after Karlovy Vary). The festival presents a wide spectrum of contemporary and retrospective examples of high-quality film including alternative, film-school and amateur works to a diverse viewing public.

History
The festival was founded in December 1993 in Prague by movie and television company Febiofest. The main personalities of the foundation were Fero Fenič and Pavel Melounek. Originally taking place in one city (Prague) in two small theaters, the event gradually grew (in just ten years) into more than 140,000 viewers in two countries, 12 cities and nearly 43 theaters. In 2005 the festival presented  336 films from 65 countries. The main part of festival is still held in Prague but when the festival in Prague ends, some films are located to other cities.

2020 edition 
It was announced on 10 March 2020 that the 2020 edition would be cancelled because of the ongoing COVID-19 pandemic.

Guests
In 20 years, Febiofest has hosted directors and actors such as Nanni Moretti, Claude Lelouch, Geraldine Chaplin, Gaspar Noé, Peter Weir, Olivier Assayas, Roman Polanski, Volker Schloendorff, Isztvan Szabo, Tsai Ming-Liang, Tom Tykwer, Hal Hartley, Andrey Konchalovski, Armin Mueller Stahl, Nikita Mikhalkov, Carlos Saura or Claudia Cardinale.

Award

Grand Prix of the festival is dedicated to debuting European filmmakers in New Europe section. Award started in 2008. The 33-member jury awarding the Grand Prix consists of applicants from 15 to 100 years old, to people of all education, social background, professions, and interests plus honorary chairman such as D.O.P. Miroslav Ondricek, architect Jan Kaplicky, artist David Cerny, conductor Libor Pesek, and former First Lady Dagmar Havlova.

Awarded Films:

Kristián Award for Contribution to the World Cinema was formerly given to personalities such as Roman Polanski, Helmut Berger, Richard Lester, Claudia Cardinale, Charles Aznavour, Carlos Saura, Daniel Olbrychski, Otar Ioseliani, Wim Wenders and Mike Leigh.

The annual award 1995-2011 was the Kristián (Czech critic's prizes). It focused attention not only on Czech feature films, but on animated and documentary works. The prize was made by famous sculptor Olbram Zoubek.

Venue
Czech Republic
Prague
Ostrava
Brno
Liberec
Pardubice
Slovakia
Bratislava
Košice
Nitra
Žilina
Prešov
Martin
Banská Bystrica

References

External links

Official site
Febiofest in New Style
Febiofest 2005

 
Film festivals in Prague
Film festivals established in 1993